Spring Song (Czech: Jarní píseň) is a 1944 Czechoslovak film. The film starred Josef Kemr.

Partial cast
 Hana Vítová as Jana Mirská-Sequencová 
 Jarmila Smejkalová as Poldi  
 František Smolík as MUDr. Sýkora  
 Svatopluk Beneš as Franci Oborský  
 Růžena Šlemrová as Hrabenka Oboronská  
 Ema Kreutzerová as Paní Kautská  
 Jaromíra Pačová as Baroness Gizela  
 František Hanus as Petr Domin  
 Pavla Vrbenská as Marenka 
 Jindřich Plachta as lékárnik  
 Marie Rýdlová as Kozlerka  
 Jana Dítětová as Jana

References

External links
 

1944 films
1940s Czech-language films
Czech romantic drama films
Czechoslovak black-and-white films
Czechoslovak romantic drama films
1944 romantic drama films
1940s Czech films